Denis Langlois (born 10 December 1968 in Drancy) is a French race walker.

International competitions

References

1968 births
Living people
People from Drancy
French male racewalkers
Olympic athletes of France
Athletes (track and field) at the 1996 Summer Olympics
Athletes (track and field) at the 2000 Summer Olympics
Athletes (track and field) at the 2004 Summer Olympics
World Athletics Championships athletes for France
Sportspeople from Seine-Saint-Denis
20th-century French people
21st-century French people